Jeffrey Pfeffer (born July 23, 1946, St. Louis, Missouri) is an American business theorist and the Thomas D. Dee II Professor of Organizational Behavior at the Graduate School of Business, Stanford University, and is considered one of today's most influential management thinkers.

Biography
Pfeffer graduated high school from the Webb School of California. He received his BS and MS degrees from Carnegie-Mellon University and his PhD from Stanford University. He began his career at the business school at the University of Illinois and then taught at the University of California, Berkeley from 1973-1979.

Pfeffer has given talks in 39 countries around the world and has taught management seminars for numerous companies and associations in the United States including Sutter Health, the Mayo Clinic, Kaiser Permanente, John Hancock, Hewlett-Packard, and the Online Publishers Association now called Digital Content Next (DCN).

Pfeffer has served on the boards of several human capital management companies including Resumix, Unicru, and Workstream.  He also served on the board of publicly traded Sonosite (SONO) for ten years and on the boards of private high-technology companies Actify and Audible Magic. He is currently on the board of directors of the nonprofit, Quantum Leap Healthcare, as well as on the advisory boards of several private companies.

Pfeffer has won numerous awards for his articles and books. He was elected a fellow of the Academy of Management more than 25 years ago, was a fellow at the Center for Advanced Studies in the Behavioral Sciences, won the Richard D. Irwin award for scholarly contributions to management, is in the Thinker's 50 Hall of Fame, and in 2011, was awarded an honorary doctorate from Tilburg University in The Netherlands.

Work
Pfeffer formalized the study of resource dependence theory in his text The External Control of Organizations:  A Resource Dependence-Perspective, which he co-authored with Jerry Salancik.

Pfeffer has done theoretical and empirical research on the subjects of human resource management, power and politics in organizations, evidence-based management, the knowing-doing gap, leadership, stratification and labor markets inside organizations, the sociology of science, how and why theories become self-fulfilling, the psychological relationship between time and money, and economic evaluation.

Pfeffer has also been recognised for writing case studies, and was listed among the top 40 case authors published by The Case Centre in 2016. He was ranked 25th in 2015/16.

Elective on power in organizations
Pfeffer has taught both elective and core classes in human resource management and the core course in organizational behavior. When he joined the Stanford faculty, he developed an elective on power in organizations. First called Power and Politics in Organizations, some years ago the class was retitled The Paths to Power. The elective has been consistently popular, with Pfeffer teaching two sections per year and, over the years, other colleagues teaching sections as well.

Writings 
Pfeffer has written more than 150 articles and book chapters. He is the author of 15 books including The Human Equation:  Building Profits by Putting People First, Managing with Power:  Politics and Influence in Organizations, The Knowing-Doing Gap:  How Smart Companies Turn Knowledge Into Action, Hidden Value:  How Great Companies Achieve Extraordinary Results with Ordinary People, Hard Facts, Dangerous Half-Truths, and Total Nonsense:  Profiting from Evidence-Based Management, What Were They Thinking?  Unconventional Wisdom About Management, and Power:  Why Some People Have It—And Others Don't, published and released in September 2010 . Pfeffer's book, entitled Leadership BS: Fixing Workplaces and Careers One Truth at a Time, was published in 2015 by HarperBusiness. His latest book “Dying for a Paycheck” analyzes workplace practices that are detrimental to employees’ health. He estimates that such practices cause 120,000 excess deaths per year in the USA, about half of which might be preventable.

Pfeffer has written cases on how individuals acquire power and manage their careers, including cases on Keith Ferrazzi, Jeffrey Sonnenfeld, Ross Walker, Amir Dan Rubin, Zia Yusuf, and Laura Esserman. He has also written cases on companies that practice high commitment/high performance work arrangements, including Southwest Airlines, DaVita Inc., the Men's Wearhouse, Holy Cross Hospital, SAS Institute, and the Andean region of Kimberly-Clark.

For five years, Pfeffer wrote a monthly column for the Time-Warner magazine, Business 2.0.  For almost three years, he wrote a career advice column for Capital, the leading economics and business magazine in Turkey.  He currently writes an online column about twice a month for Fortune.

Publications
 1978. The External Control of Organizations: A Resource Dependence Perspective. with Gerald R. Salancik. Harper & Row
 1975. Organizational Design (A H M Publications, 1975)
 1981. Power in Organizations (HarperCollins, 1981)
 1982. Organizations and Organization Theory (HarperCollins, 1982)
 1992. Managing with Power: Politics and Influence in Organizations (Harvard Business School Press, 1992)
 1994. Competitive Advantage Through People: Unleashing the Power of the Work Force (Reed Business Information, 1994)
 1997. New Directions for Organization Theory:  Problems and Prospects (Oxford University Press USA, 1997)
 1998. The Human Equation:  Building Profits by Putting People First (Harvard Business School Press, 1998)
 2000. The Knowing-Doing Gap:  How Smart Companies Turn Knowledge into Action. With Robert I. Sutton (Harvard Business School Press, 2000)
 2000. Hidden Value:  How Great Companies Achieve Extraordinary Results with Ordinary People With Charles A. O'Reilly III (Harvard Business School Press, 2000)
 2006. Hard Facts, Dangerous Half-Truths, and Total Nonsense: Profiting from Evidence-Based Management With Robert I. Sutton (Harvard Business School Press, 2006)
 2007. What Were They Thinking: Unconventional Wisdom About Management (Harvard Business School Press, 2007)
 2010. Power: Why Some People Have It and Others Don't (HarperBusiness, 2010)
 2015.  Leadership BS:  Fixing Workplaces and Careers One Truth at a Time (HarperBusiness, 2015).

In other media

Music
On their 2016 album Who Has The Time, Tulsa, Oklahoma band The Earslips released a song titled "Jeffrey Pfeffer's Wikipedia Article Summary." The lyrics are the lines from the first paragraph of the English Wikipedia article about him.

References

External links 

 Jeffrey Pfeffer's Biography
 Jeffrey Pfeffer’s personal home page
 Jeffrey Pfeffer's Stanford GSB website
 Website for evidence-based management
 Pfeffer’s Business Educators Member Profile

1946 births
Living people
American business theorists
Carnegie Mellon University alumni
Stanford University alumni
University of Illinois Urbana-Champaign faculty
University of California, Berkeley faculty
Stanford University Graduate School of Business faculty
People from St. Louis
Bestselling case authors